The Cessna L-19/O-1 Bird Dog is a liaison and observation aircraft. It was the first all-metal fixed-wing aircraft ordered for and by the United States Army following the Army Air Forces' separation from it in 1947. The Bird Dog had a lengthy career in the U.S. military, as well as in other countries.

Design and development
The U.S. Army was searching for an aircraft that could fly over enemy locations to collect information related to artillery fire target locations and distances, as well as perform liaison duties, and preferably be constructed of all metal, as the fabric-covered liaison aircraft used during World War II (primarily Stinson and Piper products) had short service lives. After the specification for a two-seat liaison and observation monoplane was issued the Cessna Aircraft Company submitted the Cessna Model 305A, a development of the Cessna 170. The Cessna 305A was a single-engine, lightweight, strut-braced, high-wing monoplane with a tailwheel landing gear. 

The greatest difference from the Cessna 170 was that the 305A had only two seats, in tandem configuration (the largest tandem-seat aircraft Cessna ever produced), with angled side windows to improve ground observation. Other differences included a redesigned rear fuselage, providing a view directly to the rear (a feature later dubbed "Omni-View", carried over to Cessna single-engine aircraft after 1964), and transparent panels in the wings' center-section over the cockpit (similar to those found on the Cessna 140 and the later Cessna 150 Aerobat model), which allowed the pilot to look directly overhead. A wider door was fitted to allow a stretcher to be loaded.

The U.S. Army awarded a contract to Cessna for 418 of the aircraft, which was designated the L-19A Bird Dog. The prototype Cessna 305 (registration N41694) first flew on 14 December 1949, and it now resides in the Spirit of Flight Center in Erie, Colorado. Deliveries began in December 1950, and the aircraft were soon in use fighting their first war in Korea from 1950 through 1953. An instrument trainer variant was developed in 1953, later versions had constant speed propellers, and the final version, the L-19E, had a larger gross weight. Cessna produced 3,431 aircraft; it was also built under license by Fuji in Japan.

The L-19 received the name Bird Dog as a result of a contest held with Cessna employees to name the aircraft. The winning entry, submitted by Jack A. Swayze, an industrial photographer, was selected by a U.S. Army board. The name was chosen because the role of the army's new aircraft was to find the enemy and orbit overhead until artillery (or attack aircraft) could be brought to bear on the enemy. While flying low and close to the battlefield, the pilot would observe the exploding shells and adjust the fire via his radios, in the manner of a bird dog (gun dog) used by game hunters.

Operational history

Military service
The United States Department of Defense (DOD) ordered 3,200 L-19s that were built between 1950 and 1959, entering both the U.S. Army and U.S. Marine Corps inventories, initially designated as the OE-1 in the Marine Corps.  The aircraft were used in various utility roles such as artillery spotting, front-line communications, medevac, and training.

In 1962, the Army L-19 and Marine Corps OE-1 were redesignated as the O-1 Bird Dog and entered the Vietnam War. During the early 1960s, the Bird Dog was flown by the Republic of Vietnam Air Force (RVNAF), U.S. Army, and U.S. Marines in South Vietnam and later by clandestine forward air controllers (e.g., Ravens) in Laos and Cambodia.  Because of its short takeoff and landing (STOL) and low altitude/low airspeed capabilities, the O-1 also later found its way into U.S. Air Force service as a Forward Air Controller (FAC) aircraft for vectoring faster fighter and attack aircraft and supporting combat search-and-rescue operations recovering downed aircrews.

During the Vietnam War, the Bird Dog was used primarily for reconnaissance, target acquisition, artillery adjustment, radio relay, convoy escort, and the forward air control of tactical aircraft, including bombers operating in a tactical role.

Supplementing the O-1, then gradually replacing it, the USAF switched to the Cessna O-2 Skymaster and North American OV-10 Bronco, while the U.S. Marine Corps took delivery of the OV-10 to replace their aging O-1s. Both were faster twin-engine aircraft, with the OV-10 being a turboprop aircraft. Still, the U.S. Army retained the Bird Dog throughout the war with up to 11 Reconnaissance Airplane Companies (RACs) deployed to cover all of South Vietnam, the Vietnamese Demilitarized Zone (DMZ), and the southern edge of North Vietnam. Its quieter noise footprint, lower speed, tighter maneuverability, short runway ability, and better visibility (even to the rear) kept it highly valued by the ground units it supported and highly feared by enemy units it flew over. The last U.S. Army O-1 Bird Dog was officially retired in 1974.

During the Vietnam War, 469 O-1 Bird Dogs were lost to all causes. The USAF lost 178, the USMC lost 7, and 284 were lost from the U.S. Army, RVNAF, and clandestine operators. Three Bird Dogs were lost to enemy hand-held surface-to-air missiles (SAMs).

Two O-1 Bird Dogs were loaned to the Australian Army's 161 Reconnaissance Flight operating out of Nui Dat in Phuoc Tuy Province. One was lost to ground fire in May 1968, killing 161's commanding officer. Another Bird Dog was built by this unit's maintenance crew, using aircraft sections salvaged from dumps around Vietnam. It was test-flown and later smuggled back to Australia in pieces, contained in crates marked as "aircraft spares". This aircraft now resides in the Museum of Army Flying at the Army Aviation Center at Oakey, Queensland.

As the USAF phased out the O-1 in favor of the O-2 and OV-10, many O-1s in the United States were sold as surplus. During the 1970s and 1980s, Ector Aircraft remanufactured many as the Ector Mountaineer with their original powerplants and as the Ector Super Mountaineer with the Lycoming O-540-A4B5.

Civil Air Patrol service
In the early 1970s, as the O-2 Skymaster and OV-10 Bronco replaced the O-1 in frontline USAF service, several former USAF O-1s were turned over to the USAF's civilian auxiliary, the Civil Air Patrol (CAP), for duties such as aerial search in support of domestic search and rescue (SAR) operations. However, since very few CAP pilots had prior training and experience as professional military aviators and/or significant experience with tailwheel aircraft, many CAP O-1 aircraft were damaged in ground loops and other takeoff, landing, or taxiing mishaps. 

To reduce both risk and repair costs, the USAF directed CAP that all O-1 aircraft in CAP service be eventually replaced for safety reasons by single-engine tricycle-gear civilian Cessnas common to general aviation, primarily Cessna 172 and Cessna 182 aircraft. The only O-1 remaining in the CAP inventory is a permanent static display aircraft on a pylon in front of CAP Headquarters at Maxwell Air Force Base, Alabama.

Civilian use

Many former USAF and former CAP O-1 and L-19 aircraft were sold to private owners as recreational aircraft. In contrast, others went to museums where they are usually displayed in their military combat markings. Others found their way to glider clubs in the U.S. as a reliable and robust vehicle to tow gliders into the air. As with most aircraft used for glider towing, the aircraft has also been outfitted with mirrors mounted to the struts.

In Canada, the Royal Canadian Air Cadets use former CAF L-19 aircraft equipped with a towing rig to tow their Schweizer 2-33A gliders for the Air Cadet gliding program. These particular L-19 variants are used in the Atlantic, Eastern, and Pacific regions. They have been modified for noise reduction using a smaller-diameter, four-blade Hoffman composite propeller in all regions except the Pacific Region and exhaust modification. The fuel delivery system has also been modified from the original design, placing the fuel selector valve closer to the pilot. The L-19/O-1 is a popular warbird with private pilots.

In the U.S., the Franconia Soaring Association in Franconia, N.H., uses an O-1, tail number N4796G, to tow its gliders, including Schweizer SGS 1-26 gliders and Grob G103 Twin Astir and Pilatus B4-PC11 sailplanes, as of July 2012.

As of June 2009, more than 330 were registered with the Federal Aviation Administration. Others are owned and operated outside the U.S. by individuals and flying organizations.

Notable flights

American television personality and actor Ed McMahon was a Marine Corps aviator who piloted an O-1E during the Korean War, flying 85 combat missions and earning six Air Medals in 1953.

Captain Sidney Harrison, U.S. Army, a decorated veteran of World War II and the Korean War, crashed his Cessna O-1 on a flight from Wichita, Kansas, to Buckley Air Force Base, Colorado, in 1952. The wreckage is still in the woods above Palmer Lake, Colorado, and can be reached by an  hike.

Captain Hilliard A. Wilbanks, USAF, posthumously received the Medal of Honor for sacrificing his life on February 24, 1967, while supporting an ARVN Ranger Battalion at Di Linh, near Da Lat, South Vietnam. After knowing their ambush had been compromised and fighter support would soon come, the Viet Cong charged into the Rangers. Trying to slow them down, Wilbanks shot the rest of his phosphorus rockets at the enemy. After he ran out of rockets, he strafed the enemy troops using his M16 rifle and fired from the side window of the plane. After the third pass, he was wounded and crashed. He died while being evacuated to a hospital using a helicopter. 

On 29 April 1975, the day before the fall of Saigon during the Vietnam War, Republic of Vietnam Air Force Major Buang-Ly loaded his wife and five children into a two-seat Cessna O-1 Bird Dog and took off from Con Son Island. After evading enemy ground fire, Major Buang-Ly headed out to sea and spotted the aircraft carrier . With only an hour of fuel remaining, he dropped a note asking that the deck be cleared so he could land. 

Knowing there was no room for this to happen, Midway'''s commanding officer, Captain (later Rear Admiral) Lawrence Chambers, ordered US$10 million worth of South Vietnamese Bell UH-1 Iroquois ("Huey") helicopters to be pushed overboard into the South China Sea. The Bird Dog that Major Buang-Ly landed aboard Midway is now on display at the National Naval Aviation Museum at Naval Air Station Pensacola, Florida. A similar aircraft was restored in the markings of the aircraft flown by Major Buang-Ly for an exhibit at the USS Midway Museum in San Diego, California.

Variants

L-19A (Cessna 305A)
Initial production version for United States Army with  Continental O-470-11, redesignated O-1A in 1962. 2,486 built
L-19-IT
L-19A converted to instrument trained. 66 converted.
TL-19A
L-19As converted to dual control trainers, redesignated TO-1A in 1962.
XL-19B
L-19A with a  Boeing XT-50-BO-1 turboprop engine, one built.
XL-19C
L-19A with a  Continental CAE XT51-T-1 turboprop engine, two built.
TL-19D (Cessna 305B)
Instrument trainer with dual controls and powered by  Continental O-470-15, redesignated TO-1D in 1962. 310 built.
L-19E (Cessna 305C)
Improved version with strengthened airframe and powered by Continental O-470-15, became O-1E in 1962. 469 built
OE-1
60 L-19As delivered to the United States Marine Corps, redesignated O-1B in 1962
OE-2 (Cessna 321)
Redesigned version of the OE-1 with Cessna 180 wings and modified fuselage, became O-1C in 1962, 27 built
O-1A
L-19A redesignated in 1962
TO-1A
Redesignation of TL-19A
O-1B
OE-1 redesignated in 1962.
O-1C
OE-2 redesignated in 1962
O-1D
A number of TO-1Ds converted for forward air controller duties with the USAF.
TO-1D
TL-19D redesignated in 1962.
O-1E
L-19E redesignated in 1962.
O-1F (Cessna 305E)
Forward Air Controller conversions of the O-1D for the USAF
O-1G (Cessna 305D)
Forward Air Controller conversions of the O-1A for the USAF
CO-119
SIAI-Marchetti SM.1019
Turboprop variant for the Italian Army
Cessna 325
Agricultural variant of the Model 305 with spraybars and a hopper in an enclosed rear cockpit, four built

Operators

 Australian Army – 161 Recce Flight operated 2 aircraft during the Vietnam War. One was shot down on 23 May 1968, killing the flight's OC, Major George Constable. The aircraft was replaced and continued in service until 161 withdrew from Vietnam. A second plane, Bunny 2, was assembled from pieces scrounged by unit members, flown then disassembled and smuggled back to Australia as "spare parts" where it was assembled and flown.

 Austrian Air Force

 Brazilian Air Force

 Khmer Air Force

 Royal Canadian Air Force
 Canadian Army
 Royal Canadian Air Cadets

 Chilean Air Force

 French Army

 Indonesian Army

 Iraqi Air Force

 Italian Army

 Japanese Ground Self-Defense Force
 Kingdom of Laos
 Royal Lao Air Force

 Armed Forces of Malta Air Wing received five O-1Es from Italy in 1992.

 North Korean Air Force

 Royal Norwegian Air Force

 Pakistan Army

 Philippine Air Force
 Philippine Navy
 Philippine Army

 Republic of Korea Air Force

 Republic of Vietnam Air Force

 Spanish Air Force
 Spanish Army

 Saudi Air Force

 Republic of China Army
 Republic of China Marine Corps

 Royal Thai Air Force
 Royal Thai Army
 Royal Thai Navy

 United States Air Force
 United States Army
 United States Marine Corps
 Civil Air Patrol

 Vietnam People's Air Force (captured South Vietnamese aircraft)

Specifications (O-1E)

See also

References

Notes

Bibliography

 Adcock, Al. 0-1 Bird Dog. (Aircraft Number 87). Carrollton, Texas: Squadron/Signal Publications, Inc., 1988. .
 Bernard C. Nalty, Jacob Neufeld and George M. Watson, An Illustrated Guide to the Air War over Vietnam, Salamander Books Ltd, London 1982. 
 Green, William and Gerald Pollinger. The Aircraft of the World. London: Macdonald, 1955.
 Harding, Stephen. U.S. Army Aircraft Since 1947. Shrewsbury, UK: Airlife, 1990. .
 Robbins, Christopher. The Ravens: The Men Who Flew in the Secret War in Laos. New York: Simon & Schuster, 1987. .
 Taylor, John W. R. Jane's All The World's Aircraft 1962–63. London: Sampson Low, Marston & Company Ltd, 1962.
 Wheeler, Barry C. "World Air Forces 1974". Flight International'', 15 August 1974, Vol. 106, No. 3414. pp. 167–190.

External links

 Atlantic Canada Aviation Museum
 Warbird Alley
 Standard Aircraft Characteristics: O-1C (Navair Publication)
 Video clip: Historic footage of Cessna O-1 landing by VNAF pilot Major Buang aboard USS Midway during Operation Frequent Wind
 

O-1
Cessna L-19 Bird Dog
High-wing aircraft
Single-engined tractor aircraft
Glider tugs
Aircraft first flown in 1949